Moussaoui is a French transliteration of the Arabic surname Al-Musawi. The surname is most common in Algeria, Morocco and Western Sahara. It may refer to the following notable people:
Driss Moussaoui, Moroccan psychiatrist 
Mohammed Moussaoui (born 1964), president of the French Council of Muslim Faith of Moroccan descent 
Samir Moussaoui (born 1975), Algerian long-distance runner
Samir El Moussaoui (born 1986), Dutch football player of Moroccan descent
Toufik Moussaoui (born 1991), Algerian football player
Zacarias Moussaoui (born 1968), French militant, member of al-Qaeda of Moroccan descent 

Arabic-language surnames